Lundia may refer to:
 Lundia (plant), a genus of plants in the family Bignoniaceae
 809 Lundia, asteroid
 , Finnish furniture company